High Above - The untold story of Astra, Europe's leading satellite company is a book describing the development of the European satellite provider SES, published in 2010 on the occasion of the company's 25th anniversary by Broadgate Publications in Richmond, London, United Kingdom.

It is a large "coffee table" style book (32 x 24 cm) of 239 pages with hundreds of photographs.

Outline 
High Above tells the story of Société Européenne des Satellites, and how the company managed to overcome technical, political, and commercial obstacles to become one of the world's leading satellite operators. It is the story of the Luxembourg-based satellite provider and the growth of European satellite television, the history of recent developments of the European television and media industry, and their context in the wider development of television and space technology.

High Above chronicles the emergence of television as the dominant information and entertainment medium and how Astra was a main driver behind European television, paving the way for digital TV, HDTV, and 3D television. 

But the story of satellite television is more than a story of rockets and technology; it is the story of the birth of a whole array of new industries and the creation of hundreds of thousands of jobs. High Above is also a reflection of politics, 20th Century history, the Cold War and the collapse of Communism, the creation of Europe, economic growth and wealth, big brands, the Internet age and of technological convergence.

Space journalist, Gerhard Kowalski described High Above as "not only a eulogy to the TV pioneer ... also a fact-rich and fascinating history of satellite television in general" while consumer technology website Tech Radar said the book "delivers a fascinating reminder of television's early days as well as the technology behind the development of satellite TV".

Content 
Using a series of interviews with key figures from the European satellite television industry, as well as straightforward story-telling, High Above tells the inside account of how the tiny country of Luxembourg produced the company that established and then led the Direct-to-Home (DTH) satellite industry in Europe. With the commercial, technical and regulatory hurdles to overcome, it was a rough ride, both for Astra and for the broadcasters that now dominate the industry (BSkyB, Canal Plus, Premiere - now Sky Deutschland, etc.) – and the whole tale is told, the defeats as well as the victories. 

The book also chronicles the development of television itself and of satellites, with the early experiments and the story of rocketry from the first trials of Robert Goddard, through Wernher Von Braun's V-2 to the United States and Soviet Union space programmes, and the European Ariane launchers that have carried many of the Astra satellites into orbit.

High Above explains the technology behind, and within, satellite television: why satellites are used for TV broadcasting, how the geostationary orbit makes it work, how the tiny signals are received and decoded by domestic equipment, and how digital television gives a choice of thousands of channels to every home.

Authors 
High Above is edited by Chris Forrester and written by Chris Forrester with Geoff Bains, Julian Clover, Jörn Krieger, and Serge Siritzky.

Chris Forrester is a well known broadcasting journalist and industry consultant. He reports on all aspects of broadcasting with special emphasis on satellite, the business of television and emerging broadcast applications. This very much includes interactive multi-media and the growing importance of web-streamed and digitised content over all delivery platforms including satellite, cable and digital terrestrial television as well as cellular and 3G mobile. Indeed, he has been investigating, researching and reporting on the so-called "broadband explosion" for more than 25 years. He has been a freelance journalist since 1988.

Geoff Bains has worked in technology journalism since 1983, investigating, reporting, and explaining the technological advances of the time, as they affect consumers – both in their homes and in the High Street. Author of several books on computing and electronics, Geoff began to follow the emerging satellite television industry in 1986, and served as Editor of several specialist satellite television publications, including a 13-year tenure at Europe's leading consumer magazine, What Satellite. Freelance since 2003, Geoff continues to inform and guide satellite television viewers and enthusiasts both in print and online.

Julian Clover is a Media and Technology journalist. He has two decades of combined experience in online and printed media. Julian is an editor of Broadband TV News and New Television Insider. An accomplished conference moderator, Julian is a regular chairman at the annual IBC congress in Amsterdam, as well as Anga Cable in Cologne and the Broadband TV News Business Breakfasts. Television appearances include the BBC's technology magazine Click and the popular consumer programme Watchdog. He is a committee member of the Broadcasting Press Guild.

Dr. Jörn Krieger has specialised in media journalism since 1990. He has contributed to a wide range of German and English-language trade publications, including Inside Satellite TV, Rapid TV News, Inside Digital TV and Interspace, in addition to providing consultancy and analysis. His emphasis is on satellite television, cable networks, digital television, pay television and new markets such as Internet Protocol television (IPTV), High-definition television (HDTV) and mobile television.

Serge Siritzky studied at École nationale d'administration (ENA), one of France's Grandes Écoles. He has dual French and American nationality, and has a long career in the cinema and television industries. He is currently Editorial Director of Ecran Total, the highly regarded French magazine devoted to the audio-visual business.

See also 

 Even Higher (book)
 Beyond Frontiers (book)
 SES 
 Astra 
 Astra 1A
 Astra 19.2°E
 Satellite television

References

External links 
 Highlights of SES history
 Official Astra consumers/viewers' website
 Official SES trade/industry site

2010 non-fiction books
Books about television
Satellite television
Television technology
Satellite operators